The 1980 Princeton Tigers football team was an American football team that represented Princeton University during the 1980 NCAA Division I-A football season. Princeton tied for third in the Ivy League.

In their third year under head coach Frank Navarro, the Tigers compiled a 6–4 record but were outscored 198 to 175. Mark W. Bailey and Paul R. Van Pelt were the team captains.

Princeton's 4–3 conference record tied for third place in the Ivy League standings. The Tigers were outscored 137 to 124 by Ivy opponents.

Ivy League football teams expanded their schedules to 10 games in 1980, making this the first year since 1953 that the Tigers played three games against non-Ivy opponents.

Princeton played its home games at Palmer Stadium on the university campus in Princeton, New Jersey.

Schedule

References

Princeton
Princeton Tigers football seasons
Princeton Tigers football